The Roman Catholic Diocese of Albacete is a diocese located in the city of Albacete in the Ecclesiastical province of Toledo in Spain.

History
 November 2, 1949: Established as Diocese of Albacete from the Diocese of Cartagena, Diocese of Cuenca and Diocese of Orihuela

Leadership
 Bishops of Albacete (Roman rite)
Arturo Tabera Araoz, C.M.F. (13 May 1950 – 23 July 1968)
 Bishop Ireneo García Alonso (7 December 1968 – 4 August 1980)
 Bishop Victorio Oliver Domingo (27 May 1981 – 22 February 1996)
 Bishop Francisco Cases Andreu (26 June – 26 November 2005)
 Bishop Ciriaco Benavente Mateos (since 16 October 2006)

See also
Roman Catholicism in Spain

Sources
 GCatholic.org
 Catholic Hierarchy
  Diocese website

Roman Catholic dioceses in Spain
Christian organizations established in 1949
Roman Catholic dioceses and prelatures established in the 20th century
1949 establishments in Spain